NGC 1333 is a reflection nebula located in the northern constellation Perseus, positioned next to the southern constellation border with Taurus and Aries. It was first discovered by German astronomer Eduard Schönfeld in 1855. The nebula is visible as a hazy patch in a small telescope, while a larger aperture will show a pair of dark nebulae designated Barnard 1 and Barnard 2. It is associated with a dark cloud L1450 (Barnard 205).

This nebula is in the western part of the Perseus molecular cloud and is a young region of very active star formation, being one of the best-studied objects of its type. It contains a fairly typical hierarchy of star clusters that are still embedded in the molecular cloud in which they formed, which are split into two main sub-groups to the north and south. Most of the infrared emission is happening in the southern part of the nebula. A significant portion of the stars seen in the infrared are in the pre-main sequence stage of their evolution.

Within the nebular are 20 young stellar objects producing outflows, including Herbig–Haro objects. A total of 95 X-ray sources that are associated with known members of embedded star clusters. In 2011 researchers reported finding 30 to 40 brown dwarf objects in the cloud and in the Rho Ophiuchi cloud complex.

Gallery

References

External links

 Agrupació Astronòmica d'Eivissa (AAE)
 Cala d'Hort Telescope (TCH)
 Spitzer Space Telescope page on NGC 1333
 
 
 Amateur photography
 See NGC1333 in WorldWide Telescope

Reflection nebulae
Star-forming regions
Perseus (constellation)
1333